Miralda gemma is a species of sea snail, a marine gastropod mollusc in the family Pyramidellidae, the pyrams and their allies.

Description
The small, white shell grows to a length of 3 mm. It is elongate-conic, slender, slightly umbilicated. The at least two whorls of the protoconch are obliquely about half immersed in the first of the later whorls. The six whorls of the teleoconch are flattened, with strong tabulated and crenulated summits. They are crossed by three strong, rounded, subequally spaced, spiral keels and rounded axial ribs between the sutures. The latter extend from the summit to and over the second keel, but not over the sulcus separating this from the third. The junctions of the axial ribs and the spiral keels form strong tubercles. The sulcus between the second and the third keel is deep, decidedly  deeper than the peripheral sulcus, both of which, as well as the sulci of the base, are crossed by minute closely placed, axial raised threads. The base of the body whorl is well rounded, somewhat attenuated. It is marked by live strong, rounded, subequal and subequally spaced spiral keels. The aperture is oval. The posterior angle is acute. The outer lip is wavy. The columella  is short, curved and slightly revolute. It is provided with a quite strong oblique fold near its insertion. The parietal wall covered by a moderately thick callus.

Distribution
This marine species occurs in the following locations:
 Madagascar
 Southeast Asia
 Japan

References

 Melvill J.C. (1910). A revision of the species of the family Pyramidellidae occurring in the Persian Gulf, Gulf of Oman and North Arabian Sea, as exemplified mostly in the collections made by Mr. F.W. Townsend (1893-1900), with descriptions of new species. Proceedings of the Malacological Society of London 9: 171-207, pl. 4-6

External links
 To Encyclopedia of Life
 To World Register of Marine Species

Pyramidellidae
Gastropods described in 1861